Train Stop – Two Minutes is a 1972 Soviet television musical film directed by Mark Zakharov and Aleksandr Orlov.

Plot 
From Moscow to the provincial town of Nizhnie Volchki comes a young and handsome doctor Igor Maksimov to work. He is liked by his colleagues, including the young nurse Alyona. However, life in a small town quickly gets boring for Igor, since there is no customary urbanization for the modern Muscovite in the Nizhnie Volchki, and the population is rarely sick and the local clinic is often empty, which means that neuropathologist Igor simply does not have anyone on whom to practice. He begins to miss the metropolitan life, friends and beloved woman – a famous pop singer. Alyona, realizing that Igor is almost ready to go back to Moscow, she decides to make him stay and turns for help to an eccentric local peasant Vasily, who has the gift of a real magician.

Cast 
Yuri Belov – Vasily Nazarovich, the magician
Oleg Vidov – Igor Pavlovich Maksimov, neurologist
Valentina Telichkina – Alyona, a nurse
Alexander Vigdorov – Mikhalko
Alla Budnitskaya – Tamara Sergeevna Krasovskaya, the singer
Lyudmila Ivanova – aunt Liza, a nurse
Yuri Sarantsev – Vlas Petrovich, director of the club
 Viktor Sergachyov – Chief Physician
Boris Sichkin – gorodki player, malinger
Kira Smirnova – Glafira Mironovna
Tatyana Gavrilova – mermaid
Svetlana Shvayko – Telephone operator
Irina Sushina – telephone operator / waitress
Alla Meshcheryakova – secretary and telegraph operator
Nina Krachkovskaya – Nina Vasilievna, the owner of the apartment
Leonid Kanevsky – Krasovsky, entertainer (voiced by Valentin Gaft)
Rimma Emelianenko – girl with a bagel
Yuri Sorokin – guy with a guitar
Igor Surovtsev – blond in a striped shirt
Vitaly Komissarov – malinger
Vladimir Grammatikov – malinger in an orange T-shirt
Andrei Droznin – toothless malinger
Sergey Malishevsky – malinger
Roman Yuryev-Lunts – an old man at the meeting point
Eduard Abalov – passenger of the train
Mark Zakharov – malinger
Svetlana Dutka – girl with an apple

Music 
Gennady Gladkov – music
Yuri Entin – lyrics
Alla Pugacheva – female vocals

References

External links 

1972 films
1972 television films
Soviet television films
Soviet musical films
Studio Ekran films
Films directed by Mark Zakharov
Films directed by Aleksandr Orlov
Films scored by Gennady Gladkov